Shahmar (also Romanized as Shāhmār; also known as Shāhmār-e Dīreh) is a village in Direh Rural District, in the Central District of Gilan-e Gharb County, Kermanshah Province, Iran. At the 2006 census, its population was 205, in 49 families.

References 

Populated places in Gilan-e Gharb County